This is a list of animated feature films that were released in 2002.

Highest-grossing animated films of the year

See also
 List of animated television series of 2002

References

 Feature films
2002
2002-related lists